The Thailand national under-20 football team is the national team for the under-20 and 19 level, representing Thailand in international football competitions in the FIFA U-20 World Cup, AFC U-19 Championship and AFF U-19 Youth Championship. It is controlled by the Football Association of Thailand.

Thailand is a two-time AFC champions and four-time AFF champions. Thailand has never managed to qualify for the FIFA U-20 World Cup, but the under-17 national team has done so.

Results and fixtures

2022

Players

Current squad
The following 23 players were called up for the 2023 AFC U-20 Asian Cup qualification in Oman.

Recent call-ups
The following players have also been called up to the Thailand squad within the last 12 months.

Previous squads

AFC U-19 Championship
 2008 AFC U-19 Championship squad
 2010 AFC U-19 Championship squad
 2012 AFC U-19 Championship squad
 2014 AFC U-19 Championship squad
 2016 AFC U-19 Championship squad
 2018 AFC U-19 Championship squad

AFF U19 Youth Championship
 2015 AFF U-19 Youth Championship squad
 2016 AFF U-19 Youth Championship squad
 2018 AFF U-19 Youth Championship squad

Coaching staff

Current coaching staff

Managers

Achievements

FIFA U-20 World Cup record

Note
*: Denotes draws including knockout matches decided on penalty kicks.

AFC U-20 Asian Cup record

Note
*: Denotes draws including knockout matches decided on penalty kicks.

AFF U-19 Youth Championship record

Note
1 : The under-20 national team played at the 2002 to 2007 editions.
* : Denotes draws including knockout matches decided on penalty kicks.

Honours
This is a list of honours for the Thailand national under-20 football team.

Continental titles
 AFC U-19 Championship
 Winners (2): 1962, 1969
 Third place (5): 1961, 1963, 1966, 1976, 1994

Regional titles
 AFF U-19 Youth Championship
 Winners (5): 2002, 2009, 2011, 2015, 2017
 Runners-up (2): 2010, 2016
 Third place (3): 2006, 2007, 2014

Others
 Hassanal Bolkiah Trophy
 Winners (2): 2005, 2007
 Runners-up (1): 2002
 Jockey Club International Youth Tournament
 Winners (1): 2017
International U-19 Thanh Niên Newspaper Cup
 Third place (3): 2022

See also
 Thailand national football team
 Thailand women's national football team
 Thailand national under-23 football team
 Thailand national under-21 football team
 Thailand national under-17 football team

References

External links
 Football Association of Thailand 
 Thai Football.com
 Thai football page of Fifa.com
 Thai football Blog

u20
Asian national under-20 association football teams